The white-faced cuckoo-dove (Turacoena manadensis), also known as the white-faced dove, is a species of bird in the family Columbidae.
It is endemic to Sulawesi and the Togian Islands in Indonesia. The Sula cuckoo-dove was previously considered conspecific.

References

Endemic birds of Sulawesi
Turacoena
Birds described in 1830
Taxa named by Jean René Constant Quoy
Taxa named by Joseph Paul Gaimard
Taxonomy articles created by Polbot